Lee Chang-yong (born 15 February 1985) is a South Korean luger. He competed in the men's singles event at the 2002 Winter Olympics.

References

External links
 
 

1985 births
Living people
South Korean male lugers
Olympic lugers of South Korea
Lugers at the 2002 Winter Olympics
Sportspeople from Seoul